The Best of (1988–1993) is the second greatest hits album by Ziggy Marley and the Melody Makers.

Tracks
Kozmik
Look Who's Dancing
One Bright Day
Goodtime
Joy and Blues
Justice
Black My Story (Not History)
Lee & Molly
New Love
Tomorrow People
Brothers and Sisters
Rainbow Country
Tumblin' Down
Small People
When the Lights Gone Out
Who Will Be There
Conscious Party

Ziggy Marley and the Melody Makers albums
1997 greatest hits albums
Virgin Records compilation albums